The Oquendo-class destroyers was a class of three destroyers built for the Spanish Navy. The nine initially projected Oquendo-class destroyers were the most ambitious project fronted by the programs of naval construction of the post-war period in Spain; however, the adoption of Rateau/Bretagne propulsion system, being of a low reliability and high complexity, coupled with the limited capacity of the shipbuilding industry in Spain at the time, led to one of the largest investor fiascos of the Spanish Navy in the 20th century. These ships would be assigned the names and numbers of; D-41 Oquendo, D-42 Roger de Lauria, and D-43 Marqués de la Ensenada.

They were named after Admiral Antonio de Oquendo.

Original order 

The Oquendo class was original provisioned in 1943 with the ordering of nine ships. Besides the three ships that were built their names would have been "Blas de Lezo", "Gelmírez", "Lángara", "Bonifaz", "Recalde", and "Blasco de Garay".

Difficulties with construction 

The Oquendos were, from the beginning a headache for their designers. The first ship was not launched until 1959, 15 years after initial procurement of material, despite asking for assistance from Ateliers Bretagne in 1955 in order to finish the power plant.

In response to the slow progress of the class, it was decided to radically alter the last two vessels of the class being built, with both being towed from Ferrol to Cartagena, Spain where the ships were literally cut in half lengthwise in order to widen the ships in an effort to resolve some of the stability issues experienced in the original Oquendo. In addition the Spanish Navy attempted to procure modern weaponry and sensors for these vessels. After initial attempts to purchase English arms, it was decided to mount the FRAM II system commonly used on the American destroyers of the era.

With the design amendments,  reading of the features of Roger de Lauria and Marqués de la Ensenada would indicate that these were modern and well-equipped ships for their time, at least on paper. Despite the best conversion efforts, these ships made similar mistakes as the previous , the original power plant and machinery was kept. As a result, despite being the first ships built in Spain that were equipped with advanced electronic warfare equipment, helicopter facilities, a complete anti-submarine warfare combat system, including variable depth sonar, these ships were limited in their operational capacity from the beginning. Moreover, the enormous amount of resources put into this project prevented the funding and addressing of other possible improvement programs.

The result of these issues was that the Oquendo-class ships had relatively short life spans for the type and time period, being 15, 13, and 18 years for Oquendo, Roger de Lauria, and Marqués de la Ensenada respectively. In addition, the 18 years of service for Marqués de la Ensenada was not due to good performance, but to the fact that in 1981, when Marqués de la Ensenada was about to be discharged, she was damaged in Santander by a bomb planted by the ETA in the line of flotation buoys around the ship. In order to avoid the image of the destruction of a ship that had just suffered a terrorist attack, along with the consequent advertising by the attackers, it was decided to maintain the vessel in service, prolonging its lifespan thru 1988.

Operations 

Oquendo was assigned to the 21st Escort Squadron of Cartagena along with the s. This squadron was sometimes affectionately called "Los Cinco Latinos". Meanwhile Roger de Lauria and Marqués de la Ensenada were assigned to the 11th Escort Squadron along with the Churruca-class destroyers.

In 1971 Marqués de la Ensenada sailed on an international tour of European waters making port calls at Naples, Casablanca, and Portsmouth. Besides the ETA attack previously mentioned the destroyers of the Oquendo class led relatively quiet careers.

Ships of the class 

Three ships of the Oquendo class were built.

See also 

Fernando Villaamil
Antonio de Oquendo

Citations 

Oquendo-class destroyers
Destroyer classes